Old Palace may refer to:
Old Palace, Canterbury
Old Palace, Berlin
Eski Saray, Istanbul
Old Palace, Oxford
The Old Palace, Worcester
Old Palace, York

See also
Croydon Palace, London, UK
Palazzo Vecchio at the Lazzaretto of Manoel Island, Gżira, Malta
Old Royal Palace, Athens, Greece
Palazzo Vecchio, Florence, Italy
Stari dvor, Serbia